Laldinliana Renthlei (born 26 August 1998), is an Indian professional footballer who plays as a defender for Jamshedpur in the Indian Super League.

Career
Born in Mizoram, Renthlei began his career in the Mizoram Premier League with Chhinga Veng. Renthlei had also represented Mizoram in the Santosh Trophy in 2017. In December 2017, he helped Chhinga Veng become the 2017–18 MPL champions after they defeated Aizawl in the final 1–0.

A couple weeks later, Renthlei joined Aizawl for their I-League campaign. He made his professional debut for the club on 27 December 2017 against Minerva Punjab. He started and played the whole match as Aizawl won 2–1. A month later, on 30 January 2018, Renthlei made his Asian club competition debut when he started for Aizawl during their AFC Champions League qualifier match against Iranian side Zob Ahan Esfahan. Once again he started and played the whole match but couldn't prevent Aizawl from losing 3–1.

He was signed by Chennaiyin in 2018-19 and made 11 appearances on his debut season. However, after failing to establish his name under John Gregory (footballer), his career at Chennaiyin FC was rejuvenated by Owen Coyle in the second half of the 2019–20 Indian Super League season playing all the remaining games and would go on to earn himself a runners-up medal with Chennaiyin FC

On 3 September 2020, Jamshedpur FC announced the inclusion of Dinliana to its roster, joining his previous coach Owen Coyle who then recently signed for the Steel City of India side. He joined the club on a 3-year deal from ISL season 2020-21 to 2022-23. He will wear the same no. 21 as he did in Chennayin

Career statistics

Honours

Club
Chhinga Veng
Mizoram Premier League: 2017–18

References

1998 births
Living people
People from Mizoram
Indian footballers
Aizawl FC players
Association football defenders
Footballers from Mizoram
Mizoram Premier League players
I-League players
Chhinga Veng FC players
Indian Super League players
Chennaiyin FC players
Jamshedpur FC players